Jason Jung was the defending champion but lost in the final to Yasutaka Uchiyama.

Uchiyama won the title after defeating Jung 6–2, 6–2 in the final.

Seeds

Draw

Finals

Top half

Bottom half

References
Main Draw
Qualifying Draw

International Challenger Zhangjiagang - Singles
2018 Singles